Agustín Vales Castillo (1857 – 1938) was a Mexican businessman, banker, industrialist, landowner, philanthropist, and politician who was mayor of Mérida between 1902 and 1907. A member of the Liberal Party, in political and economic matters he was close to Olegario Molina, becoming one of the most prominent members of the Yucatecan oligarchy of the Porfiriato, known as the "divine caste" (casta divina) or the "fifty henequen kings."

His residence was Casa Vales, one of the most iconic mansions on Paseo de Montejo (currently the Mérida headquarters of Banco Santander).

Family 
He was born in Mérida, Yucatán in 1857. His parents were Agustín Vales, a businessman and landowner originally from Galicia, Spain, and María de Castillo Dafrota, originally from Mérida.

The Castillo family, his maternal branch, was a distinguished clan of landowners who had come to Yucatán since colonial times, being able to prove nobility (hidalgura) from the Old World because, according to Valdés Acosta, "those of this lineage proved their descent from Cornelius the Centurion." the first gentile to convert to Christianity, and “their ancestral home (solar) is in the Burgos Mountains and is one of the most distinguished.”

Marriage 
On July 24, 1879, he married María Cristina Millet Hübbe, daughter of José María Millet Aragón and María Cristina Hübbe García Rejón. The couple had the following offspring:

 Maria Vales Millet married to Adolfo Casares Villamil
 Agustín Vales Millet married to Mercedes Guerra Aguilar
 Carlos Vales Millet married to Rosa Cámara Zaldívar

Meanwhile, his sister, María del Carmen Vales Castillo, married Raymundo Cámara Luján, head of the Cámara family, one of the principal patrician families of Yucatán.

Through this marriage, Agustín Vales was related to several prominent Maderista politicians in the Yucatán Peninsula. Two of his nephews supported the antireelectionist cause: Alfredo and Nicolás Cámara Vales served as governor of Quintana Roo and Yucatán, respectively. Similarly, María Cámara Vales married José María Pino Suárez, who served as vice-president of Mexico in the Madero administration.

Political Career 
Before becoming mayor of Mérida, Agustín Vales was already an outstanding businessman; it has been pointed out that Olegario Molina, governor of Yucatán, chose to distinguish him with the political position as he was considered a "man of energy, probity, talent and knowledgeable about the environment in which he would have to work." Likewise, other sources point to him as "skillful and bold promoter of economic progress." Governor Molina (from the Liberal Party) chose Agustín Vales despite the fact that he had been a supporter of the Conservative Party in the previous administration:“Taking advantage of the economic situation that Yucatán went through, a group of conservative merchants was formed, members of the regional Porfirian oligarchy such as Eusebio Escalante Bates, Raymundo Cámara Luján and Agustín Vales Castillo, among others, who formed the so-called “Lonja Meridiana” and the clique related to the newly elected governor, General Francisco Cantón Rosado.”During his period as mayor of Mérida, he promoted several public works including the paving and drainage of Mérida, the construction of a Lunatic asylum, the expansion of the Penitentiary. He also promoted the foundation of the Hospital General Agustín O'Harán de Mérida which, to this date is recognized as one of the best hospitals in the country. For the foundation of the hospital, he donated a significant amount of his own fortune along with other benefactors which included Leandro Ayala and members of the Molina family. In February 1906, when president Porfirio Díaz visited Mérida, he was received at an elegant reception at the Vales residence.

However, it is also pointed out that, in the Porfirian style, Vales ruled over Mérida with authoritarianism, suppressing, for example, the Union of Workers with the purpose of "preventing syndicalism from growing." Other sources indicate that he supported hygienist policiesincluding the prohibition of intoxicating drinks, even ordering that all the canteens in the city be closed.

Business career 
His closeness to Olegario Molina was not limited to political affairs, in business, he was also Molina's partner in several companies related to the exploitation of Henequen. Likewise, together with the Ancona Cámara brothers, he was the owner of Hacienda Chenkú, one of the most important haciendas of Yucatán.

In partnership with Raymundo Cámara Luján (his brother-in-law) and Eusebio Escalante Bates, he founded the Compañía Agrícola del Cuyo y Anexas, S.A, having a minority ownership. The company eventually employed more than 1,500 employees and controlled a 2,627 km² large estate (roughly the size of Rhode Island) in the northwestern part of Yucatán. These lands were: "rich in dyewood, optimal for growing sugarcane, vanilla, tobacco, maize and cereals, as well as suitable for harvesting sea salt […] Among the productive activities of the plantation we can highlight the exploitation of forest resources (dyes, fine wood for cabinet making and hard wood for construction), as well as the extraction of resins (chewing gum), the obtaining of sea salt, the cultivation of sugar cane, the development of crops of tobacco, cocoa, cotton, banana and vanilla, the latter brought from Papantla, Veracruz. Likewise, for the self-consumption of its inhabitants, corn, rice, beans and all other natural products available on the aforementioned farm were produced on the land […] The dyewood that the Company exported was in demand in the European markets of the textile manufactory of Hamburg, Le Havre and Liverpool. As for chewing gum, it was sent out to New York, carrying out the commercialization of an average of 400 thousand kg per year.” Likewise, he also stood out in the field of banking and finance. He was a founding partner and member of the first board of directors of Banco Mercantil Yucateco, S.A. that competed with Banco de Yucatán, S.A. The first bank was formed by businessmen related to the interests of Olegario Molina while the second bank was formed by businessmen related to the interests of Eusebio Escalante Bates and Raymundo Cámara Luján. In 1937, shortly before his death, he founded Banco Mercantil de Tampico, S.A. and Sociedad Financiera Mercantil, S.A. His son, Agustín Vales Millet, inherited and expanded the business empire that his father had forged. In 1934, together with Alfonso Ponce Cámara and other businessmen, he founded Banco de Yucatán, S.A. (successor of the former financial group with the same name), acting as Chairman of the Board of Directors on several occasions.

Despite his closeness to Olegario Molina, Vales also maintained close business ties with the Madero Family, a powerful line of industrialists from the north of the country who became one of the wealthiest families in Mexico at the dawn of the 20th century, financing the Mexican Revolution against the dictator Porfirio Díaz. In 1912, Agustín Vales partnered with Ernesto Madero Farías, secretary of the treasury under president Francisco I. Madero, to incorporate the Compañía Harinera del Golfo, S.A. which for many years was the main supplier of flour in the Yucatán Peninsula.

References 

19th-century Mexican politicians
1857 births
1938 deaths